Kristina Tonteri-Young (born 17 January 1998) is a Finnish-New Zealand actress and former ballerina.

Early life and career
Tonteri-Young was born in Finland to Finnish and New Zealand parents of Finnish and Chinese ethnicities and speaks fluent English and Finnish. Her family moved to New York City when she was 6 years old. From 2009 to 2012, she attended The Bolshoi Ballet Academy in Moscow, where she learnt Russian. During her time there, Tonteri-Young appeared in La fille mal gardée at the Bolshoi Theatre and The Sleeping Beauty and Le Corsaire at the Kremlin Ballet. At age 16, she got into acting, attending some Shakespeare summer courses at RADA. She attended Guildhall School of Music and Drama as a Skinners’ Lawrence Atwell Scholar from 2016 to 2019, and graduated with a Bachelor of Arts. There, she appeared in a few stage plays.

Her first on screen role was Netflix's series Warrior Nun, where she starred as Sister Beatrice. She has since appeared in a few films, including Netflix's Outside the Wire.

Acting credits

Film and Television

Theatre

Ballet

External links 

 
 Kristina Tonteri-Young  profile at Independent Talent Group
 Kristina Tonteri-Young on Cameo

References

1998 births
Living people
21st-century Finnish actresses
Finnish stage actresses
Finnish ballerinas
Finnish people of New Zealand descent
Finnish people of Chinese descent